Limnostylochidae is a family of flatworms belonging to the order Polycladida.

Genera:
 Limnoplana Faubel, 1983
 Limnostylochus Bock, 1913

References

Platyhelminthes